Be My Eyes is a Danish mobile app that aims to help blind and visually impaired people to recognize objects and cope with everyday situations. An online community of sighted volunteers receive photos or videos from randomly assigned affected individuals and assist via live chat. The app is currently available for Android and iOS.

How it works 
A visually impaired person starts a live stream showing their view from their cellphone camera. They are assigned, through a phone call or chat, a random volunteer who speaks the same language and who is in the same time zone. This allows the volunteer to describe an object and assist the visually impaired person, such as guiding the person to move their camera, read instructions, or clean up a spill. Through speech synthesis, content can be read out loud. This process encourages a more independent life for blind and visually impaired people.

User base 
Over 6.3 million volunteers and 470,000 blind or visually impaired people use the app. Over 180 languages and 150 countries are represented.

Development and release 
The app was developed and marketed by Hans Jørgen Wiberg. He had demonstrated that although there are video chat software such as Skype and Facetime, none is tailored for the visually impaired. For development, he joined forces with the Danish Association of the Blind, and other organizations.

The app was first presented at an event for start-up companies in 2012 and first released in 2015. A version for Android was released in 2017, in addition to the iOS version.

The company has raised over $650,000, including funding from Silicon Valley, Microsoft, and other angel investors.

In October 2019, Be My Eyes Deep Link was integrated into the Right Hear mobile application for the blind and visually impaired.

In February 2020, $2.8 million in Series A funding was raised, allowing the company to further develop its business model while keeping visual support services free for visually impaired users. New , according to a company news release. The investment allows the company to further develop its unique “purpose and profit” business model while keeping the visual support service free and unlimited for all visually impaired users.

Reception 
Praise was given for easy use of the app. The lack of sufficient data protection, which makes it possible to pass on data to third parties, was criticized.

Awards 

 Nordic Startup Awards for "Best Social Entrepreneurial Tech Startup" in Denmark

References 

Blindness
Mobile applications